Mididi (or) was a Carthaginian and Roman settlement during antiquity, located at what is now Henchir-Medded, Tunisia. 14 neo-punic inscriptions, known as the Mididi inscriptions, were found in Mididi by René Basset.

History

Mididi was part of the Roman province of Byzacena.

Diocese
There are two bishops attributable to Mididi. The Catholic bishop Serenian attended the 411 Council of Carthage between the Catholic  and Donatist bishops of Roman North Africa. On that occasion, the seat had no Donatist bishops. Eubodio took part in the 484 Synod of Carthage convened by the Arian king Huneric, after which Eubodio was exiled. Fulgentius of Ruspe also founded a monastery near Mididi at the beginning of the 6th century.

Today Mididi survives as a titular bishopric:

 Luís Gonzaga Fernandes (1965–1981)
César Bosco Vivas Robelo (1981–1991)
Luis Gleisner Wobbe (1991–), auxiliary bishop of La Serena.

References

Citations

Bibliography
 . 

Catholic titular sees in Africa
Former Roman Catholic dioceses in Africa
Roman towns and cities in Tunisia
Archaeological sites in Tunisia
Ancient Berber cities
Ancient cities